The 2015 Shepherd Rams football team represented Shepherd University as a member of the Mountain East Conference (MEC) during the 2015 NCAA Division II football season. Led by 29th-year head coach Monte Cater, the Rams compiled an overall record of 13–1 with a mark of 10–0 in conference play, winning the MEC title. Shepherd advanced to the NCAA Division II Football Championship playoffs and received a first-round bye. The Rams played their home games at Ram Stadium in Shepherdstown, West Virginia.

Regular season
The 2015 regular season for the Rams consisted of 10 games against Mountain East Conference foes. The Rams went undefeated in the regular season and were given the top seed in Super Region I in the 2015 NCAA Division II football playoffs.

Playoffs
The Rams received a first-round bye in the playoffs, being the top-ranked team in Super Region 1. Their first postseason game was at home against IUP, a 1713 win.

The Rams then went on to defeat Slippery Rock, 2816, in a quarterfinal game to continue their playoff run.

In the national semifinals on December 12, 2015, the Rams played Grand Valley State. The Rams won the game 3432, to reach the 2015 NCAA Division II Football Championship Game.

In the National Championship game, Shepherd lost to NW Missouri State 347.

Schedule

References

Shepherd
Shepherd Rams football seasons
Shepherd Rams football